Charkhestaneh (also Romanized as Charkhestāneh; also known as Charkhtaneh (Persian: چرختانه), also Romanized as Charkhtāneh) is a village in Pachehlak-e Gharbi Rural District, in the Central District of Azna County, Lorestan Province, Iran. At the 2006 census, its population was 143, in 28 families.

References 

Towns and villages in Azna County